The 2010 Middle Tennessee Blue Raiders football team represented Middle Tennessee State University as a member of the Sun Belt Conference during the 2010 NCAA Division I FBS football season. Led by fifth-year head coach Rick Stockstill, the Blue Raiders compiled an overall record 6–7 with a mark of 5–3 in conference play, placing third in the Sun Belt. Middle Tennessee was invited to the GoDaddy.com Bowl, where they lost to the Miami RedHawks, 35–21. The team played home games at Johnny "Red" Floyd Stadium in Murfreesboro, Tennessee.

During the off season
In January 2010, defensive coordinator, Manny Diaz, left Middle Tennessee and accepted the defensive coordinator job at Mississippi State.  Weeks later, Wisconsin assistant Randall McCray was hired to lead the defense.

In February 2010, offense coordinator Tony Franklin left Middle Tennessee to accept the vacant position of offensive coordinator at Louisiana Tech. On March 3, Mike Schultz, former TCU and Illinois offensive coordinator, was hired to coach the Blue Raider offense.

Schedule

Game summaries

Minnesota
Pregame line: Minnesota -3.0

Austin Peay
Pregame line: N/A

Memphis
Pregame line: Middle Tennessee -4.5

Louisiana–Lafayette 
Pregame line: Middle Tennessee -2.0

Troy
Pregame line: Middle Tennessee -3.5

Georgia Tech
Pregame line: Georgia Tech -18.5

Louisiana–Monroe
Pregame line: Middle Tennessee -12

Arkansas State
Pregame line: Middle Tennessee -1.5

North Texas
Pregame line: Middle Tennessee -10.5

Western Kentucky
Pregame line: Middle Tennessee -4.5

Florida Atlantic
Pregame line: Middle Tennessee -5.5

FIU
Pregame line: Florida International -5.0

Miami (OH)–GoDaddy.com Bowl
Pregame line: Middle Tennessee -2

Coaching staff
 Head coach: Rick Stockstill
 Defensive line: John Palermo
 Offensive coordinator, quarterbacks: Mike Schultz
 Offensive Line: Jimmy Ray Stephens
 Wide receivers: Justin Watts
 Inside receivers: Brent Brock
 Defensive coordinator, linebackers: Randall McCray
 Running backs: Willie Simmons
 Safeties: David Bibee
 Cornerbacks: Steve Ellis
 Strength: Russell Patterson

NFL Draft
5th Round, 147th Overall Pick by the Jacksonville Jaguars—Sr. CB Rod Issac

References

Middle Tennessee
Middle Tennessee Blue Raiders football seasons
Middle Tennessee Blue Raiders football